Leonard Gilbert (23 January 1908 – 25 June 1974) was an English cricketer. He played four first-class matches for Bengal between 1934 and 1936.

See also
 List of Bengal cricketers

References

External links
 

1908 births
1974 deaths
Bengal cricketers
Cricketers from Epsom
English cricketers
Europeans cricketers